Antonio Muñoz Molina (born 10 January 1956) is a Spanish writer and, since 8 June 1995, a full member of the Royal Spanish Academy. He received the 1991 Premio Planeta, the 2013  Jerusalem Prize, and the 2013 Prince of Asturias Award for literature.

Biography 
Muñoz Molina was born in the town of Úbeda in Jaén province. He studied history of art at the University of Granada and journalism in Madrid. He began writing in the 1980s; his first published book, El Robinsón urbano, a collection of his journalistic work, was published in 1984. His columns have regularly appeared in El País and Die Welt.

His first novel, Beatus ille, appeared in 1986. It features the imaginary city of Mágina—a re-creation of his Andalusian birthplace—which would reappear in some of his later works.

In 1987 Muñoz Molina was awarded Spain's National Narrative Prize for El invierno en Lisboa (translated as Winter in Lisbon), a homage to the genres of film noir and jazz music. His El jinete polaco received the Planeta Prize in 1991 and, again, the National Narrative Prize in 1992.

His other novels include Beltenebros (1989), a story of love and political intrigue in post-Civil War Madrid, Los misterios de Madrid (1992), and El dueño del secreto (1994).

Muñoz Molina was elected to Seat u of the Real Academia Española on 8 June 1995; he took up his seat on 16 June 1996.

Muñoz Molina is married to Spanish author and journalist, Elvira Lindo. He currently resides in New York City, United States, where he served as the director of the Instituto Cervantes from 2004 to 2005.

Margaret Sayers Peden's English translation of Muñoz Molina's novel Sepharad won the PEN/Book-of-the-Month Club Translation Prize in 2004. He also won the Jerusalem Prize in 2013. Isabelle Gugnon's French translation of Muñoz Molina's novel Un andar solitario entre la gente won the 2020 Prix Médicis étranger.

Bibliography
 El Robinsón urbano, 1984.
 Diario de Nautilus, 1985.
 Beatus Ille, 1986. English translation: A Manuscript of Ashes. Trans. Edith Grossman. Orlando: Harcourt, c2008.
 El invierno en Lisboa, 1987. English translation: Winter in Lisbon. Trans. Sonia Soto. London: Granta, 1999.
 Las otras vidas, 1988.
 Beltenebros, 1989. English translation: Prince of Shadows. London: Quartet, 1993
 Córdoba de los omeyas, 1991.
 El jinete polaco, 1991.
 Los misterios de Madrid, 1992.
 Nada del otro mundo, 1993.
 El dueño del secreto, 1994.
 Las apariencias, 1995.
 Ardor guerrero, 1995.
 La huerta del Edén, 1996.
 Pura alegría, 1996.
 Plenilunio, 1997.
 Carlota Fainberg, 1999.
 En ausencia de Blanca, 2001. English translation: In her absence. Trans. Esther Allen. New York: Other Press, c2006. .
 Sefarad, 2001. English translation: Sepharad. Trans. Margaret Sayers Peden. Orlando: Harcourt, ©2003. .
 La vida por delante, 2002.
 Las ventanas de Manhattan, 2004
 El viento de la luna, 2006
 Días de diario, 2007
 La noche de los tiempos, 2009. English translation: In the Night of Time. Trans. Edith Grossman. Boston: Houghton Mifflin Harcourt, 2013. .
 Todo lo que era sólido, 2013
 Como la sombra que se va, 2014. English translation: Like a Fading Shadow. Trans. Camilo A. Ramirez. New York: Farrar, Straus and Giroux, 2017. 
 Un andar solitario entre la gente, 2018. English translation: To Walk Alone in the Crowd. Trans. Guillermo Bleichmar. New York: Farrar, Straus and Giroux, 2021. ISBN 9780374190255.

References

External links
Official webpage Includes articles, blog entries and a comprehensive bibliography.
English webpage English link to the official webpage.
Books That Changed My Life PEN World Voices at the New York Public Library May 4, 2008
Mumonline | Open Directory: the most comprehensive Internet directory about Antonio Muñoz Molina
 'The Man of Proverbs' Muñoz Molina essay excerpt from 'Traces of Sepharad (Huellas de Sefarad), Etchings of Judeo-Spanish Proverbs' by Marc Shanker, essays by Muñoz Molina and T.A. Perry
 'I'm a Stranger Here Myself, NY Times review of Sepharad
Antonio Muñoz Molina recorded at the Library of Congress for the Hispanic Division’s audio literary archive on Mar. 12, 2015

1956 births
Living people
People from Úbeda
Members of the Royal Spanish Academy
Spanish novelists
Spanish male novelists
University of Granada alumni
Prix Femina Étranger winners
Jerusalem Prize recipients
Articles containing video clips
Prix Médicis étranger winners